Martin Peter Voss (born 5 September 1967 in Aarhus) is a retired Danish athlete who specialised in the pole vault. He represented his country at the 1996 Summer Olympics, as well as five consecutive World Championships, starting in 1991. His only major final came at the 1998 European Indoor Championships where he finished sixth.

His personal bests in the event are 5.70 metres outdoors (Lyngby 1996) and 5.72 metres indoors (Malmö 1995). The latter is the still standing national record.

Competition record

References

1967 births
Living people
Danish male pole vaulters
Athletes (track and field) at the 1996 Summer Olympics
Olympic athletes of Denmark
Sportspeople from Aarhus